Roberto Cesati (born February 5, 1957 in Milan) is a retired Italian professional football player.

External links
 

1957 births
Living people
Italian footballers
Association football forwards
Serie A players
Inter Milan players
Delfino Pescara 1936 players
Piacenza Calcio 1919 players
Taranto F.C. 1927 players
U.S. Pistoiese 1921 players
Parma Calcio 1913 players
Giulianova Calcio players